This is a list of songs associated with the anime adaptations of the Slayers light novel series.

TV opening songs

TV ending songs

Movie/OVA/game themes

Radio drama songs

Image songs

Anime soundtracks
Discographies of Japanese artists
Film and television discographies
Songs